Jicomé is a town in the Valverde province of the Dominican Republic.

Notable people 
Hipólito Pichardo (born August 22, 1969) is a Dominican former right-handed pitcher in Major League Baseball who played for three teams between 1992 and 2002. He batted and threw right-handed.

Sources 
 – World-Gazetteer.com

Populated places in Valverde Province